DaT Scan (DaT scan or Dopamine Transporter Scan) commonly refers to a diagnostic method to investigate if there is a loss of dopaminergic neurons in striatum. The term may also refer to a brand name of Ioflupane (123I) which is used for the study. The scan principle is based on use of the radiopharmaceutical Ioflupane (123I) which binds to dopamine transporters (DaT). The signal from them is then detected by the use of single-photon emission computed tomography (SPECT) which uses special gamma-cameras to create a pictographic representation of the distribution of dopamine transporters in the brain.

DaTSCAN is indicated in cases of tremor in patients, when we are not sure about its origin. Although this method can distinguish essential tremor from Parkinson's syndrome, it is unable to show us if the problem is Parkinson's disease, multiple system atrophy or progressive supranuclear palsy.

Its main advantage is that DaTSCAN is able to diagnose Parkinson´s disease much earlier – in stage of 30% loss of the dopamine brain cells instead of 80-90%, when the symptoms are already so visible, that we can be sure about the diagnosis.

Procedure 
At the beginning a patient should take two iodine tablets and wait for one hour. These pills are highly important, because they prevent the accumulation of radioactive substances in thyroid gland. After one hour, the patient gets an injection to shoulder, which contain the radiopharmaceutical and then he has to wait for 4 hours. The concentration of the substance increases and then it is scanned by gamma-camera, which is located around his head. Whole examination lasts about 30–45 minutes and it is non-invasive.

If a patient use some of the medication listed below, it is necessary to stop the using few days or weeks before the DaTSCAN, but just after a consultation with his doctor.

The examination takes just a few hours, so patients needn´t to stay in a hospital overnight, but they have to drink much more than they are used to and go to the toilet more often. It is important for a fast elimination of the radioactive substances from the body.

Contraindications 
 pregnancy
 breast-feeding
 severe renal or hepatic insuficience 
 allergy to iodine substances
 some kind of medication – stimulants or noradrenalin and some antidepressants

Differential Diagnosis 
 Parkinson's disease, multiple system atrophy or progressive supranuclear palsy
 Essential tremor
 Lewy body disease

See also 
 Essential tremor
 Multiple system atrophy
 Progressive supranuclear palsy

External links 
 European Parkinson´s Disease Association
 DaTSCAN
 Patient´s view

References 

Neurology
Neuroimaging
Medical physics
Dopamine reuptake inhibitors
Parkinson's disease
3D nuclear medical imaging
Radiobiology